Copake Grange Hall, also known as Copake Grange #935, is a historic Grange hall located at Copake in Columbia County, New York, U.S.A.  It was built in 1902–1903, with additions in 1906 and 1921.  It is a two-story wood-frame building with a gable roof and two one story flat roofed wings. For many years the second floor served as a public library.

It was added to the National Register of Historic Places in 2001.

References

Grange buildings on the National Register of Historic Places in New York (state)
Grange organizations and buildings in New York (state)
Cultural infrastructure completed in 1903
Buildings and structures in Columbia County, New York
National Register of Historic Places in Columbia County, New York